Shewanella denitrificans is a bacterium from the genus of Shewanella which has been isolated from water from the Gotland Deep from the Baltic Sea.

References

Alteromonadales
Bacteria described in 2002